Slapping the Table in Amazement is a collection of vernacular short stories, written by Ling Mengchu (1580–1644). It was composed in the middle of the 17th century during the end of the Ming dynasty. It involves 78 stories in all and is divided into two parts: the first and the second (Er Pai for short) . There are forty stories in each part. Slapping the Table in Amazement contains many different stories, such as folk legends, romances and unofficial history.

Thanks to the prosperity of commodity economy and social progress. Er Pai expresses mercantilism, and open values of love and marriage. At the same time, there are many out dated ideas in this book, such as  feudalism and superstition, comeuppance and ideas of fatalism, along with some explicit love scenes. Moreover, the author attacked the peasant uprisings toward the end of Ming dynasty in some articles. The novel is remarkable not only for its stunning storylines, but also for its precise and detailed observation of the life and social structures typical of 17th-century Chinese aristocracy.

Er Pai together with the three masterpieces of Feng Menglong (1574–1646; a Chinese vernacular writer and poet of the late Ming dynasty) is called San Yan Er Pai.  They are representative works of the stories of the Ming dynasty. San Yan is distinguished by its strong artistic charm, while Er Pai vividly describes public life and expresses civil consciousness.

Early copies
The original copy of this volume has been lost, however the earliest and most complete print copy (尚友堂刊本, missing the 23rd episode) is safely treasured at a temple in Japan (日本栃木県日光市輪王寺慈眼堂).  Amazing Tales-Second series, urged by Ling's publican and published after completion in 1932, contains 39 stand-alone short stories (1 from Chunqiu Time, 14 from the Song dynasty, 3 from the Yuan dynasty, 19 from the Ming dynasty, and the final 2 remained unknown) and 1 performance script (Zaju, a type of performance originated in Tang dynasty) .  Due to the loss of the 23rd episode in the first volume, modern publicans replaced it with the same numeric numbered episode from the second volume, when combined, the two volumes together contain a total of 78 short stories plus 1 performance script. Note that the English publicans only translated a few so-found the greatest-hit episodes in each volume, and their commercial release is not a complete collection of the Er Pai.

Artistic features
Slapping the Table in Amazement vividly represented life at that time, created in 1627. The sales volume reached an all-time high.
In art, he by the succinct writing style, has portrayed vivid characters, narrated twists and turns of details. He thought: people nowadays just know that ghosts and monsters, which can't be seen or heard, were astounding. But they ignore that, in our daily life there are many spooky things, which can be detected, but can't be explained with common sense. Capturing extraordinary things in ordinary life, by absorbing readers, is the key to his success.

“script for story-telling (话本)" originated from “story-telling (说话)" in the Tang dynasty, which means telling stories, and it prevailed in Song dynasty. Script for story-telling played as the outline of the story for the storyteller to tell the whole story to the audience. The readers and listeners were all the common people, so it was the literary catered to ordinary people. “Er Pai”, as a vernacular novel, was more close to the public life and ideas at that time
He expressed his profound ideas about the society in a vivid way. What is more, opposition of the shackles of personality and praise of the pursuit of  the young for love are the themes.

Based on the foundation of traditional aesthetics, "Er Pai" also keeps on trying to explore the new way of art. It has shown a unique, individual artistic face, that makes itself a treasure of ancient colloquial short stories.
The novel is composed in written vernacular Chinese rather than classical Chinese.

Involved in
The ancient narrative literature, as the Medieval Literature, describe the emperor and hero's deeds. While, in many chapters of Er Pai, the most described are the merchants of Huizhou, person carrying loads, hawkers, prostitutes, people, who are playing Chinese chess, thieves, and such lower figures. It reflects the new change of social ethics with the development of commodity economy.
It also describes the licentious stories of many Taoists and Buddhists.
The author put emphasis on the social effect of his work. He selected material from the common events in the public life, so as to reveal the true and the false and ugly. In such a society of that time where there was more evil than good, it helped people to get psychological balance, when they found in the novel that bad person did not get good results. For example, in the very beginning of the eighth volume: People are all afraid of robbers, but it's a pity that everywhere we can find them.  If an official does not correctly use his power, bringing calamity to the country and people, while enjoying high salary, isn't he a robber? That's why his work was so popular among the ordinary people.

Structure
In Chinese ancient literature, the meaning of existence of every single person can be confessed only by his social relationships. For all his psychologies, wills, desires are considered into a common framework, it is hard to describe anything disordinary about the cockles of the heart of hero. Therefore, a passport to an excellent character is to descript actions, instead of depicting psychological processes. Placing emphasis on plots, drawing figures’ descriptions in a straightforward style, focusing attentions by complex stories, are important marks of Chinese ancient novels and storiettes.
When it comes to structure, usually, the beginning and the ending are corresponding with each other. The appearance of a character is always accompanied with introductions of his place of origin and personal identity, and his parents’ origins and identities. At the end the author would clear the endings of the hero and his offspring. Almost all these literature aimed at expression the theme, plots unfolds in of sequence, ignoring falling into the stereotypes.

About San Yan and Er Pai
Slapping the Table in Amazement and The second collection of striking the Table in Amazement  of Ling MengChu (凌濛初) in thought and artistic style tendency are the same. People used to call these two books "Er Pai". The "Er Pai" as eponymous as the "San Yan"( three books of Feng MengLong (冯梦龙) : Yu Shi Ming Yan (喻世明言), Jing Shi Tong Yan (警世通言),  Xing Shi Heng Yan (醒世恒言)). "Er Pai" was made a big difference by "San Yan" . Withal, Ling MengChu made no attempt to conceal the truth, he said:" works only by Feng MengLong were the most artistic, and broke corrupt customs of the society in that time. " Ling MengChu wrote "Er Pai" as well as broke corrupt customs of the society in that time.

"Er Pai" and "San Yan" are still different. "San Yan" collected and processed scripts for story-telling (in Song, Yuan and Ming dynasty folk literature). Though there were scripts of Feng MengLong in San Yan, the proportion was very small.<ref>Material of "San Yan" and "Er Pai"' by Tan ZhengBi (谭正璧)</ref>"Er Pai" mainly wrote by Ling MengChu. His works were abbreviated and based on fact, but more lively and decorative than "San Yan".

Translations
  In the Inner Quarters: Erotic Stories from Ling Mengchu's Two Slaps. (Vancouver: Arsenal Pulp Press,  2003). Translated by Lenny Hu, with the collaboration of R. W. L. Guisso.  . Google Books
  The Lecherous Academician & Other Tales by Master Ling Mengchu.'' (London: Deutsch,1973). . .

List of stories
Translated titles in this table follow those by Shuhui Yang and Yunqin Yang in  Titles used by other translators are listed as bullet points.

References

Chinese short story collections
Chinese literature
Humour